Somebody to Love was a 2014 Filipino film produced by Regal Entertainment. It was directed by Jose Javier Reyes.

Cast 
Carla Abellana as Sabrina 
Matteo Guidicelli as Tristan 
Jason Abalos as Nicco
Isabelle Daza as Valeria 
Iza Calzado as Marga
Maricar Reyes as Sophie
Ella Cruz as Amelie
Kiray Celis as Chloe
Albie Casiño as Jason
Alex Castro as Rainier
Manuel Chua as Yves

Production 
Somebody to Love brought together stars from rival television networks. Carla Abellana received top billing; Iza Calzado stated that she accepted that situation because she knew that Abellana was also a contract star of Regal Films, and that she preferred to be defined by "how [her] role will make a mark" rather than the order of names.

Reviews 
Oggs Cruz, writing for Rappler, stated that the frequent use of split screen to emphasize that two separate events were taking place simultaneously made for an "intriguing viewing experience" but also described it as sometimes "quite grating".

See also 
 List of Filipino films in 2014

References

External links
 

2014 films
Philippine romantic comedy films
2014 romantic comedy films
Regal Entertainment films